Jason Trifiro (born 3 June 1988) is a former Australian football (soccer) player.

Career
Trifiro started his career in the semi-professional lower leagues in Australia, playing in New South Wales for National Premier Leagues NSW clubs Marconi Stallions, APIA Leichhardt and the South Coast Wolves. In 2011, he moved to Victoria where he played the 2011 Victorian Premier League with Northcote alongside his brother, before they both moved to ex-NSL heavyweight South Melbourne in the National Premier Leagues Victoria.

In 2012 Trifiro was signed as one of the inaugural players for Western Sydney Wanderers. In 2014, he signed a one-year extension with the club. Following the 2014–15 A-League, Trifiro was one of a swathe of players released from the Wanderers, following a poor season in which the club narrowly avoided the wooden spoon, finishing 9th.

On 16 September 2015, Melbourne City signed Trifiro as their last signing on their roster.

On 28 April 2016, Trifiro was released by Melbourne City.

Personal life
Jason's brother Glen Trifiro plays for Sydney United in the National Premier Leagues NSW.

The brothers run a football clinic called Futboltec. Its aims are to improve the technical aspects of young players' game, including passing, finishing, and overall awareness.

References

1988 births
Australian people of Italian descent
Association football midfielders
A-League Men players
National Premier Leagues players
Western Sydney Wanderers FC players
Melbourne City FC players
Marconi Stallions FC players
Parramatta FC players
South Melbourne FC players
Living people
Soccer players from Sydney
Australian soccer players